The 2015–16 season was Preston North End's first season back in the Championship, after gaining promotion via the play-offs last season, in their 136th year in existence. Along with competing in the Championship, the club will also participate in the FA Cup and League Cup. The season covers the period from 1 July 2015 to 30 June 2016.

Kit

|
|

Squad

Statistics

|-
|colspan=14| First Team Players on loan:

|-
|colspan=14| Players that left the club during the season:

|}

Goals record

Disciplinary record

Contracts

Transfers

Transfers in

Transfers out

Loans in

Loans out

Competitions

Pre-season friendlies
On 1 June 2015, Preston North End announced their first friendly against Chorley, competing for the Jack Kirkland Trophy. Pre-season friendlies were announced on the club's fixture list.

Championship

League table

Matches

FA Cup

League Cup

Lancashire Senior Cup

Overall summary

Summary

Score overview

References

Preston North End
Preston North End F.C. seasons